Elizabeth Crewson Paris (born January 14, 1958) is a judge of the United States Tax Court. She was appointed by President George W. Bush in February 2008. Her nomination passed the United States Senate in July 2008, and she was sworn in on July 30, 2008. Her term will expire on July 29, 2023.

Paris was born in Altus, Jackson County, Oklahoma. She is the older of two siblings, she was raised in Tulsa, Oklahoma, earning a bachelor's degree from the University of Tulsa in 1980, a Juris Doctor degree from the University of Tulsa College of Law in 1987, and a Master of Laws in taxation from the University of Denver in 1993. She is a former partner at Brumley Bishop and Paris, senior associate at McKenna and Cueno, and tax partner at Reinhart Boerner Van Deuren in the firm's Denver office. Paris served as Tax Counsel to the United States Senate Finance Committee from 2000 to 2008. She formerly taught in Georgetown University Law Center's LL.M. Taxation Program and the University of Tulsa College of Law.

References

1958 births
Living people
21st-century American judges
21st-century American women judges
Judges of the United States Tax Court
Lawyers from Tulsa, Oklahoma
People from Altus, Oklahoma
Sturm College of Law alumni
United States Article I federal judges appointed by George W. Bush
University of Tulsa alumni
University of Tulsa College of Law alumni